Qaramanlı, Neftchala may refer to:
Aşağı Qaramanlı
Yuxarı Qaramanlı